"Best Part of Me" is a song by English singer-songwriter Ed Sheeran featuring American singer Yebba. It was released on 5 July 2019 through Asylum and Atlantic Records, along with "Blow", as the fourth and fifth singles respectively from his compilation album No.6 Collaborations Project (2019).

Background and composition
About working with YEBBA, Ed Sheeran stated "I loved making [the] record. YEBBA is phenomenal, she's onto massive things". "Best Part of Me" was announced as part of the tracklist for No.6 Collaborations Project (2019). Sheeran revealed the song's release date on 4 July 2019. It was released alongside "BLOW" the next day.

"Best Part of Me" is a romantic pop ballad. According to Idolators Mike Nied, the song is a romantic ballad which "builds up to a very loved-up chorus". Spin's Rob Arcand wrote that it "slows things down", comparing it to Sheeran's solo acoustic rendition of the Justin Bieber collaboration "I Don't Care" (2019).

Credits and personnel
Credits adapted from Tidal.

Ed Sheeran – vocals, songwriter, producer, bass, guitar
YEBBA – featured vocals, songwriter
Benny Blanco – songwriter, producer, keyboards
Joe Rubel – producer, engineer, keyboards
Thomas Bartlett – keyboards
Pino Palladino – bass
Chris Sclafani – engineer
Gosha Usov – engineer
Archie Carter – assistant engineer
Robert Sellens – assistant engineer
Anthony Evans – editor
Stuart Hawkes – masterer
Mark "Spike" Stent – mixer
Matt Wolach – mixer
Michael Freeman – mixer

Charts

Certifications

Release history

References

External links
 
 

2010s ballads
2019 singles
2019 songs
Asylum Records singles
Atlantic Records singles
Ed Sheeran songs
Pop ballads
Songs written by Ed Sheeran
Songs written by Benny Blanco
Songs written by Yebba
Song recordings produced by Benny Blanco
Yebba songs